Cristinel Piciorea (born 16 February 1960) is a Romanian luger. He competed in the men's doubles event at the 1980 Winter Olympics.

References

1960 births
Living people
Romanian male lugers
Olympic lugers of Romania
Lugers at the 1980 Winter Olympics
Place of birth missing (living people)